Nguyễn Thị Hồng is Vietnamese economist, currently serving as the Governor of the State Bank of Vietnam (SBV) since 2020.  She holds a master's degree in Developmental Economics and started working at SBV in 1991, where she held several management positions.

References 

1968 births
Living people
Governors of the State Bank of Vietnam
Vietnamese politicians
Vietnamese economists